The National Moravian-Silesian Theatre (NDM) is a professional theatre company based in Ostrava in the Czech Republic. It is one of ten opera houses in the country, and the largest theatre company in the Moravian-Silesian Region. The NDM has two permanent theatres, the Antonín Dvořák Theatre and the Jiří Myron Theatre. The company was registered in 1918, and the theatre was first opened to the public on 19 August 1919.

Artistic output
The theatre consists of four artistic companies: drama, opera, operetta/musical, and ballet. Each year the theatre stages 16–19 premieres and just under 500 performances. The current director of the theatre is Jiří Nekvasil, and the artistic directors of the four companies are Jakub Klecker (opera), Vojtěch Štěpánek (drama), Lenka Dřímalová (ballet), and Gabriela Petráková (operetta/musical).

Names
 1919: National Moravian-Silesian Theatre (NDMS)
 1941: Czech Moravian-Silesian Theatre (ČDMO)
 1945: Provincial Theatre of Ostrava (ZDO)
 1948: State Theatre of Ostrava (SDO)
 1995: National Moravian-Silesian Theatre (NDM)

List of directors

 Václav Jiřikovský (1919–1923)
 František Uhlíř (1923–1926)
 Miloš Nový (1926–1930)
 Ladislav Knotek (1930–1939)
 Karel Jičínský (1939–1939)
 Jan Škoda (1940–1942)
 Jiří Myron (1942–1946)
 Stanislav Langer (1946–1948)
 Antonín Kurš (1948–1952)
 Drahoš Želenský (1952–1953)
 Miloslav Holub (1954–1956)
 Vladislav Hamšík (1956–1971)
 Zdeněk Starý (1971–1988)
 Dalibor Malina (1989–1991)
 Ilja Racek (1991–1998)
 Luděk Golat (1998–2009)
 Jiří Nekvasil (since 2010)

References

Moravian-Silesian Region
Theatres in Ostrava
Music venues in the Czech Republic
Theatres completed in 1918
Music venues completed in 1918
Opera houses in the Czech Republic